Quinta da Beloura is an affluent gated community and golf resort located in Linhó, Sintra, on the Portuguese Riviera. The community is known for hosting numerous golf tournaments, tennis opens, and equestrian & dressage events, as well as for being the home of numerous famous personalities.

History

Quinta da Beloura was founded as a luxury planned community in the Sintra Mountains, the traditional summer domain of the Portuguese nobility.

Resort
Quinta da Beloura is home to the Pestana Beloura Golf Resort, part of the Pestana Group, a Portuguese luxury hotel group.

Golf

Quinta da Beloura's golf courses were designed by award-winning American golf architect Rocky Roquemore, who also designed the courses at Quinta do Lago and Vale do Lobo in the Algarve.

Beloura holds the Portuguese Golf Federation's annual National Seniors Championship.

Tennis
Beloura Tennis Academy (BTA) has hosted the Portuguese Tennis Federation's prestigious Campeonato Nacional Absoluto (National Absolute Championship) in 2017. BTA is known for hosting the annual Beloura Junior Open, a European qualifying tournament.

Since 2017, Beloura annually hosts the BTA Futures, part of the International Tennis Federation's Men's Circuit.

Equestrian
The Quinta da Beloura Equestrian Center (Portuguese: Centro Hípico Quinta da Beloura) holds numerous equestrian events including the Portuguese Equestrian Federation's 2015 Taça de Portugal (Portuguese Cup Championship). The Beloura team won this event in 2004.

The community hosted the 2017 and 2018 Troféu de Dressage em Póneis (English: Pony Dressage Trophy), an annual dressage competition held between equestrian academies of the Portuguese Riviera.

Beloura hosted the 2017 Portuguese National Horseball Championship.

Notable residents
Cristiano Ronaldo, Portuguese footballer
José Sócrates, former Prime Minister of Portugal
Shahal M. Khan, American owner of the Plaza Hotel in New York City
Dânia Neto, Portuguese supermodel
Carlos Xavier, Portuguese footballer for Sporting Lisbon
Bruno Vale, Portuguese footballer for FC Porto
Miguel Gameiro, Portuguese lead vocalist of Pólo Norte
Marta Aragão Pinto, Portuguese actress

References

External links

 Quinta da Beloura official site

Gated communities in Portugal
Resorts in Portugal
Golf clubs and courses in Portugal
Sintra